Poddubye is a rural locality (a village) in Ustyuzhenskoye Rural Settlement, Ustyuzhensky District, Vologda Oblast, Russia. The population was 13 as of 2002.

Geography 
Zavrazhye is the nearest rural locality.

References 

Rural localities in Ustyuzhensky District